There are many derbies in the League of Ireland, and despite the fact that historically more teams compete in the First Division, the majority are played in the Premier Division, the top flight of Irish football.

Background 

Founded in 1921 the League of Ireland is the national association football league of the Republic of Ireland. Formed by the Football Association of Ireland out of split with the Irish Football Association for the first 65 years it consisted of a single division but since the  mid 1980s it has expanded into a two tier system with a Premier Division and First Division.

Most derbies in the league occur due to close geographical proximity, with a number of clubs based in Dublin. However, there are also many rivalries between other city clubs outside the capital such as Cork City vs Limerick and Drogheda United vs Dundalk. These clubs also maintain rivalries with the Dublin-based clubs.

The earliest rivalry contested was between Bohemian and Shelbourne, Dublin based clubs who played in the Belfast-dominated Irish Football League from the early 1900s to 1920. They never won the League title, but they did win four Irish Cups between them. After the foundation of the League of Ireland in 1921 this rivalry continued along with newly formed rivalries between Shamrock Rovers and St James' Gate, with the four clubs winning all of the league's first eleven titles between them.

In the 1950s and 1960s matches between North Dublin-based Drumcondra and South Dublin based Shamrock Rovers became the premier event in leagues calendar until the Drums went out of business in 1972. While outside of Dublin Cork Celtic and Cork Hibernians enjoyed a rivalry in the 1960s. Today the Bohemians-Shamrock Rovers fixture is considered the main rivalry in the league by the media.

There are also important non-geographical rivalries such as Cork City and Shelbourne in the 2000s, or Shamrock Rovers and Sligo Rovers in the 2010s which stem from title battles.

League of Ireland sides also have rivalries with their Northern Irish club counterparts and have often met in cross-border competitions, the latest being the Setanta Sports Cup. They can also meet in European Qualifying Rounds, this has happened on four occasions in the European Cup/Champions League with Waterford United overcoming Glentoran in 1970-71, Dundalk beating Linfield in 1979-80, Shamrock Rovers losing to Linfield in 1984-85 and Shelbourne defeating Glentoran in 2005-06.

Capital Derbies

With five Dublin based clubs currently competing in the league and a number of defunct clubs over the years the city of Dublin hosts a large amount of derbies each season.

Bohemians vs Shamrock Rovers (Dublin Derby)

The biggest rivalry in the league. Following the demise of Drumcondra in the 1960s, Bohemians became the only major club from the Northside of Dublin, automatically coming into conflict with southsiders, Shamrock Rovers. Since the 1990s, the rivalry has been extremely fierce both on and off the field, with disturbances breaking out before, during and after fixtures, resulting in an excessive Garda presence at games. The attendances at the game had been declining for thirty years, but attendances unexpectedly rose in 2009, largely due to Rovers moving into Tallaght Stadium and Bohs' status as league champions, with the attendance at one game tripling on the previous encounter.  The rivalry features elements of the North-South cultural divide that exists in the city.

In 2016 during an away 4-0 win for Rovers, fans from both side invaded the pitch, fighting was reported with the Garda Public Order unit intervening.

Bohemians vs Shelbourne (Northside Derby)

The oldest derby in the league, the two are the only still functioning clubs from the original 1922 League of Ireland season and completely dominated early pre-Irish Republic league football; they competed together in the old Belfast-centered (now Northern) Irish Football League. Today they are the second and third most successful league sides and while the rivalry receded over the years at the start of the 2000s it reached its most heated as the two became the best clubs in the country winning between each other six consecutive titles. Ahead of the final game of the 2004 season free spending Shelbourne chairman Ollie Byrne announced the capture of three key Bohemians players live on RTÉ angering many Bohs fans who saw it as a tactic of buying up the opposition. Ironically after Byrne's death and Shelbourne's subsequent relegation due to financial insecurities Bohemians signed a number of Shelbourne players. 
The rivalry is significant as their home grounds in North Dublin are the closest to each other of any clubs in the league at just under two miles apart. Shelbourne based at Tolka Park in Drumcondra and Bohemians at Dalymount Park in Phibsboro and while the game is referred as the Northside derby Shelbourne were actually formed in Ringsend in South Dublin and only moved to Tolka Park in 1989 (although they had played there occasionally during their history), this adds to the feud as they are seen as moving to Bohs territory. Despite the move to Tolka initially coinciding with a revival in Shels fortunes (they have won six of their 13 league titles and four of their seven cups since 1990) they have struggled to attract significant support on the Northside with only Marino and East Wall being seen as stronger bases for supporting Shels over Bohs.

Shamrock Rovers vs St. Patrick's Athletic (Luas Derby)

 
A growing rivalry due to the proximity of the two clubs since Shamrock Rovers' move to Tallaght in 2009. Sometimes called the 'Luas Derby' as both Inchicore and Tallaght are served by the Luas Red line. Noted as one of the more colourful derby, with both clubs main fan group (SRFC Ultras and Shed End Invincebles) being formed in 2001 before others in the league. Traditionally class divisions may have played a part with Rovers based in the rather affluent Milltown and Pat's in Inchicore, an area of high deprivation, today Rovers play in the more socially deprived Tallaght.

Shelbourne vs St. Patrick's Athletic (Red Derby)
 
Sometimes referred to as The Red Dublin Serby due to the similar shirts they wear. During the 2001-02 season St. Pat's were deducted 9 points for fielding an ineligible player, these were reinstated before a further 15 points were deducted pushing St. Pat's from 1st place to 3rd and allowing Shels to win the title with 10 more points. Revived last season after Shelbourne's 5 years in Division one. Due to the prominence of the Bohemians-Shamrock Rovers rivalry the media often portrays this as the second most important in Dublin, however it remains a heated derby, with no love between the two sets of fans.

Shamrock Rovers vs Shelbourne (Ringsend Derby)
 
This rivalry is contested by the first and third most successful League of Ireland sides with 20 and 13 titles respectively, however both clubs see Bohemians as bigger rivals. 
It is named after the Ringsend area in the Eastern part of the Southside of Dublin where both clubs were founded. Despite both clubs now playing further afield their clubs names originate from Ringsend with Shelbourne taking their name from Shelbourne Road, and Shamrock Rovers’ name coming from Shamrock Avenue. Both clubs take pride in their origins and at recent fixtures between the two have held up banners claiming to be ‘Ringsend's Number One’ (Shels) and 'The Pride of Ringsend’ (Rovers).

Bohemians vs St. Patrick's Athletic (City Derby)
 
Probably the most placid rivalry between the big four, both clubs were founded in Phoenix Park but quickly moved further afield to Inchicore and Phibsboro. The two have rarely been competitive for the title at the same times as each other and both see Shamrock Rovers and Shelbourne as more important rivals.

UCD vs the Big Four
 
University College Dublin's support base consists of only around 50 fans which means during derbies at UCD Bowl there is often more away fans than home supporters.

Provincial Derbies

Former Munster Derby: Limerick FC < v Cork City

The Munster Derbies are contested between the two largest Munster clubs, Cork City and Limerick FC but sometimes the rivals are kept apart due to playing in different divisions. In recent times, Cork City and Limerick FC have been competing the Munster Derby in the Premier Division. They have been tight matches normally which draw big crowds to both stadiums. The most recent result was at Turners Cross in Cork where Limerick FC won 3-2. This derby is between the two biggest cities in what is arguably Ireland's most sports passionate province. Although the football mad cities are 100 km apart, they are the two largest clubs in the province of Munster with both clubs having large fan-bases and support at their home stadiums. They both represent their respective cities with no other club in their city. Turners Cross is well known in Irish football as one of the great stadiums for atmosphere, meanwhile since Limerick FC have returned to their 'spiritual home' of football at Markets Field for the first time in 31 years, attendances have rocketed and the famous Markets Field atmosphere of old has come back. This fixture is seen as one of Ireland's more physical league games, and statistics have shown that the Munster Derby is one of the fixtures with the most red and yellow cards issued.

In the table below records of game results can not be found from the 1986-87 season to the 1994-1995 season where Limerick were relegated and did not face Cork in a league fixture until 2010.

Northwest Derby: Derry City vs Finn Harps

Very little distance separates these two clubs and Northern bragging rights are laid on the line for these games. Traditionally, they have provided some entertaining and often talked about games down the years. The last game of any note between the two teams was a promotion/relegation play-off match in 2003 in which Derry were the victors in front of a crowd of over 6,000. With Harps promotion for the 2008 season, it returned with great anticipation and the three meetings were all sold out. Unlucky for Harps, though, Derry came out on top on all three occasions. The derby returned in 2010 following Derry's relegation from the Premier Division the previous year, but the Foylesiders still held the advantage over the Donegal men in the ties.

Louth Derby: Drogheda United vs Dundalk FC

The Louth Derby is contested by Drogheda United and Dundalk. The derby had not been played in many years due to the clubs being in different divisions. Many of Dundalk's most successful periods have corresponded with Drogheda being at the lower end of the league table or in the First Division, while Drogheda's most successful period (between 2004 and 2008) occurred while Dundalk were in the lower tier. The fixture never fails to generate a hostile and heated atmosphere, and fans of the respective clubs despise each other. During the 2017 League Of Ireland Premier Division, the fixture produced 4 red cards in 4 matches. Since Drogheda's promotion from the First Division in 2020, it has been evenly contested 10 times (including friendlies), resulting in 6 Dundalk wins and 4 Drogheda wins.

Connacht Derby: Galway United vs Sligo Rovers

The Connacht Derby is played between Galway United and Sligo Rovers.  Traditionally it had been a First Division derby but the success of both clubs meant it became a regular Premier Division encounter. Both teams regularly beat each other, resulting in an almost exact record for both, however in the Premier Division Sligo have come out on top most times.

Other derbies 
There are many other derbies and rivalries in Irish football, including:

The Cork Derby - Cork City vs Cobh Ramblers
The Midlands Derby  - Longford Town vs Athlone Town
The Southeast Derby - Wexford Youths vs Waterford United

Former rivalries
Drumcondra vs Shamrock Rovers 
Was seen as the biggest rivalry between North and South Dublin but ended with the five times League of Ireland Champions and winners of five FAI Cup finals Drumcondra going out of business in 1972 and amalgamated with Home Farm. Most of Drums support floated to nearby Phibsborough with Bohemians who had dropped their strict amateur status in 1969 allowing them to become a major force in Irish football again.

Cork Celtic vs Cork Hibernians 
Contested from the 1950s to mid 1970s. Hibernians only won one of the first 18 league fixtures but enjoyed a better record before resigning from the league losing only one of the last 14 fixtures.

Notes

 Record of league games only. From 1921-22 season till 1984-85 there was only one division. Since 1985-86 there has been two divisions, the statistics here include only matches played in the top flight.
 Home Farm's record contains one season named as Home Farm Drumcondra and one season named Home Farm Everton
 After their first three seasons in the League of Ireland Transport moved from Bray to Dublin. Transport's record only features their results since the move to Dublin.
 Dublin City results feature 5 matches from 2006 season (2 losses to Shelbourne, 1 loss to both Bohemian and St Patrick's Athletic, and 1 victory over UCD). Club dissolved during season and results expunged.

References
General 

Specific

 
League of Ireland